Hicetas (Greek:  or ) was tyrant of Syracuse, during the interval between the reign of Agathocles and that of Pyrrhus. After the death of Agathocles (289 BCE), his supposed assassin, Maenon, put to death Archagathus, the grandson of Agathocles; and assuming the command of the army with which the latter was besieging Aetna, directed his arms against Syracuse. Hereupon Hicetas was sent against him by the Syracusans, with a considerable army: but after the war had continued for some time, without any decisive result, Maenon, by calling in the aid of the Carthaginians, obtained the superiority, and the Syracusans were compelled to conclude an ignominious peace. Soon after ensued the revolution which led to the expulsion of the Campanian mercenaries, afterwards known as the Mamertines: and it must have been shortly after this that Hicetas established himself in the supreme power, as we are told by Diodorus that he ruled nine years. The only events of his government that are recorded are a war with Phintias, tyrant of Agrigentum (modern Agrigento), in which he obtained a considerable victory, and one with the Carthaginians, by whom he was defeated at the river Terias. He was at length expelled from Syracuse by Thynion, an event which took place not long before the arrival of Pyrrhus in Sicily, and must therefore be referred either to 279 BCE or 278 BCE, either of which dates is consistent enough with the period of nine years allotted to his reign by Diodorus. (Diod. Exc. Hoesch. xxi. 12, 13, xxii. 2, 6)

There are extant gold coins struck at Syracuse bearing the name of Hicetas: from the inscription on these , it is clear that he never assumed the title of "king", like his contemporary Phintias, at Agrigentum.

References

3rd-century BC Syracusans
Ancient Greek rulers
Sicilian tyrants